"Rico" is a song by Matthew Good Band. It was released as the fourth single from the band's second studio album. Underdogs. The song peaked at #23 on Canada's Singles Chart, the band's highest position ever on that chart. The song was a staple for Matthew Good Band's live performances. However, Good has never performed the song since beginning his solo career.

Track listing

Music video
The music video for "Rico" is a continuation from the "Apparitions" video. The video features Good's janitor character from the "Apparitions" video going to a nightclub. The video also features the call girl character from the "Apparitions" video entering the nightclub and having a drink after her traumatic experience in the previous video. The "Rico" video is the final MGB music video to feature bassist Geoff Lloyd, who left the band shortly after the video was filmed.

Charts

References

External links

1998 songs
Matthew Good Band songs
Songs written by Matthew Good
Songs written by Dave Genn